South West Wales Publications (SWWP), part of the Northcliffe Media, is a regional newspaper publisher based in Swansea. The company produces eight local and regional paid-for and free titles including the:
South Wales Evening Post, 
Carmarthen Journal, Llanelli Star, Swansea Herald of Wales, (until 2011)Carmarthen Herald, Neath & Port Talbot Tribune, West Wales Tribune, and The Sporting Post''.

References

External links
South West Wales Publications Ltd (official site)

Northcliffe Media
Companies based in Swansea
Newspaper companies of the United Kingdom
Mass media in Wales